Bonifacio Ondó Edú-Aguong (16 March 1922 – 5 March 1969) was the Prime Minister of Equatorial Guinea while it was still under Spanish colonial rule, as Spanish Guinea. He took office when the country gained autonomy in 1963, and ran in the country's first presidential election in 1968, losing in the run-off.
He handed power over to newly elected president Francisco Macías Nguema on 12 October 1968 (the day of independence). He was imprisoned and officially committed suicide only a few months later. Another account says he returned in 1969 from exile in Gabon and was killed.

References

1922 births
1969 suicides
Equatoguinean people who died in prison custody
People who committed suicide in prison custody
Prime Ministers of Equatorial Guinea
Prisoners who died in Equatoguinean detention
Suicides in Equatorial Guinea